Air vice-marshal Hugh Hamilton Brookes  (14 October 1904 – 16 March 1988) was a senior Royal Air Force officer.

Biography
Born on 14 October 1904, Hugh Hamilton Brookes was educated at Bedford School and at the Royal Air Force College Cranwell. After serving in Iraq, the Western Desert, Aden and with Bomber Command during World War II, he was appointed as Air Officer Commanding Rhodesia from 1951 to 1954, Air Officer Commanding Iraq from 1954 to 1956, and Air Officer Commanding No. 25 Group from 1956 to 1958.

Brookes retired from the Royal Air Force on 10 November 1958. He died on 16 March 1988.

References

1904 births
1988 deaths
People educated at Bedford School
Graduates of the Royal Air Force College Cranwell
Royal Air Force air marshals
Companions of the Order of the Bath
Commanders of the Order of the British Empire
Recipients of the Distinguished Flying Cross (United Kingdom)